I Can See Your Voice Malaysia is a Malaysian television mystery music game show series based on the South Korean programme of the same name. It features a group of "mystery singers", with the objective of guest artist(s) are to eliminate potential bad singers, assisted by clues and celebrity panelists; and the game ends with a duet between the last remaining mystery singer and one of the guest artist(s).

Overall, the series has played 67 guest artists that aired five seasons with 73 episodes on two different networks — NTV7 (from its debut on 4 August 2018 to 27 October 2018) and TV3 (from 23 June 2019 to 24 July 2022). An upcoming sixth season is scheduled to premiere in 2023.

Series overview

Episodes

Season 1 (2018)

Season 2 (2019)

Season 3 (2020)

Season 4 (2021)

Season 5 (2022)

Specials

Notes

References

I Can See Your Voice Malaysia
Lists of Malaysian television series episodes